The 1826–27 United States House of Representatives elections were held on various dates in various states between July 3, 1826 and August 30, 1827. Each state set its own date for its elections to the House of Representatives before the first session of the 20th United States Congress convened on December 3, 1827. They occurred during John Quincy Adams's presidency. Elections were held for all 213 seats, representing 24 states.

In these midterm campaigns, the aftershock of the contested 1824 presidential election remained a major issue. The former Democratic-Republican Party had split into two parties, the "Jacksonians," supporting Andrew Jackson (which would later become the Democratic Party) and the "Adams men" or "Anti-Jacksonians," supporters of President John Quincy Adams. Adams's supporters would later come to be known as the National Republican Party. The Jacksonians were able to pick up a slim majority in the House by painting an image of the Adams Men as elitist and of the Jacksonians as the party of the common farmer or artisan. This tactic helped them pick up a number of rural seats.

Election summaries

Special elections 

There were special elections in 1826 and 1827 to the 19th United States Congress and 20th United States Congress.

Special elections are sorted by date then district.

19th Congress 

|-
! 
| John Randolph
|  | Jacksonian
| 17991813 18151817 1819
|  | Incumbent resigned December 26, 1825 when appointed U.S. Senator.New member elected January 21, 1826.Jacksonian hold.Winner was seated February 6, 1826.Successor was not a candidate for election to the next term, see below.
| nowrap | 

|-
! 
| Joseph Kent
|  | Anti-Jacksonian
| 18101814 1818
|  | Incumbent resigned January 6, 1826 to become Governor of Maryland.New member elected February 1, 1826.Jacksonian gain.Successor was seated February 7, 1826.Successor later re-elected to the next term, see below.
| nowrap | 

|-
! 
| Patrick Farrelly
|  | Jacksonian
| 1820
|  | Incumbent died January 12, 1826.New member elected March 14, 1826.Anti-Jacksonian gain.Successor was seated April 3, 1826.Successor later lost re-election to the next term, see below.
| nowrap | 

|-
! 
| Christopher Rankin
|  | Jacksonian
| 1819
|  | Incumbent died March 14, 1826.New member elected July 10, 1826.Jacksonian hold.Successor was seated December 4, 1826.Successor later re-elected to the next term, see below.
| nowrap | 

|-
! 
| David Jennings
|  | Anti-Jacksonian
| 1824
|  | Incumbent resigned May 25, 1826.New member elected October 10, 1826.Anti-Jacksonian hold.Successor was seated December 4, 1826.Successor was not a candidate on the same day for the next term, see below.
| nowrap | 

|-
! 
| Joseph Hemphill
|  | Jacksonian
| 18001802 1818
|  | Incumbent resigned before October 10, 1826.New member elected October 10, 1826.Anti-Jacksonian gain.Successor was seated December 4, 1826.Successor lost election the same day to the next term, see below.
| nowrap | 

|-
! 
| Henry Wilson
|  | Jacksonian
| 1822
|  | Incumbent died August 14, 1826.New member elected October 10, 1826.Jacksonian hold.Successor was seated December 4, 1826.Successor was not elected the same day to the next term, see below.
| nowrap | 

|-
! 
| Alexander Thomson
|  | Jacksonian
| 1824
|  | Incumbent resigned May 1, 1826.New member elected October 10, 1826.Jacksonian hold.Successor was seated December 4, 1826.Successor also elected the same day to the next term, see below.
| nowrap | 

|-
! 
| Willie P. Mangum
|  | Jacksonian
| 1823
|  | Incumbent resigned March 18, 1826.New member elected November 3, 1826.Jacksonian hold.Successor was seated December 4, 1826.Successor was later re-elected to the next term, see below.
| nowrap | 

|-
! 
| James Johnson
|  | Jacksonian
| 1824
|  | Incumbent died August 13, 1826.New member elected November 6, 1826.Jacksonian hold.Successor was seated December 7, 1826.Successor was later re-elected to the next term, see below.
| nowrap | 

|-
! 
| Robert P. Henry
|  | Jacksonian
| 1822
|  | Incumbent died August 25, 1826.New member elected November 20, 1826.Anti-Jacksonian gain.Successor was seated December 11, 1826.Successor later lost re-election to the next term, see below.
| nowrap | 

|-
! 
| Enoch Lincoln
|  | Anti-Jacksonian
| 1818 
|  | Incumbent resigned in January 1826.New member elected November 27, 1826 on the second ballot.Jacksonian gain.Successor was seated December 4, 1826.Successor had already been elected to the next term, see below.
| nowrap | 

|}

20th Congress 

|-
! 
| Daniel Webster
|  | Anti-Jacksonian
| 18121816 1822
|  | Incumbent resigned May 30, 1827 to run for U.S. Senator.New member elected July 23, 1827.Anti-Jacksonian hold.Successor was seated December 3, 1827.
| nowrap | 

|-
! 
| William Burleigh
|  | Anti-Jacksonian
| 1823
|  | Incumbent died July 2, 1827.New member elected September 27, 1827.Jacksonian gain.Successor was seated December 3, 1827.
| nowrap | 

|-
! 
| Edward F. Tattnall
|  | Jacksonian
| 1820
|  | Incumbent resigned in 1827 before the assembling of Congress.New member elected October 1, 1827.Jacksonian hold.Successor was seated December 3, 1827.
| nowrap | 

|-
! 
| Louis McLane
|  | Jacksonian
| 1816
|  | Incumbent resigned some time in 1827 before the assembling of Congress after being elected to the US Senate.New member elected October 2, 1827.Anti-Jacksonian gain.Successor was seated December 3, 1827.
| nowrap | 

|-
! 
| William Wilson
|  | Anti-Jacksonian
| 1822
|  | Incumbent died June 6, 1827.New member elected October 9, 1827.Jacksonian gain.Successor was seated December 3, 1827.
| nowrap | 

|-
! 
| colspan=3 | Vacant
|  | General election ended in a tie vote and the seat remained vacant.New member elected October 9, 1827.Anti-Jacksonian gain.Successor seated January 14, 1828.
| nowrap | 

|-
! 
| David E. Evans
|  | Jacksonian
| 1826
|  | Incumbent resigned May 2, 1827.New member elected November 5, 1827.Anti-Jacksonian gain.Successor was seated December 3, 1827.
| nowrap | 

|-
! 
| John Forsyth
|  | Jacksonian
| 1822
|  | Incumbent resigned November 7, 1827 to become Governor of Georgia.New member elected November 17, 1827.Jacksonian hold.Successor was seated January 14, 1828.
| nowrap | 

|-
! 
| William S. Young
|  | Anti-Jacksonian
| 1824
|  | Incumbent died September 20, 1827.New member elected November 5–7, 1827 but initial winner declined the seat to avoid an election dispute.Upon re-election, new member elected December 22, 1827.Jacksonian gain.Successor was seated January 11, 1828.
| nowrap | 

|-
! 
| Henry W. Conway
|  | Unknown
| 1822
|  | Incumbent died November 9, 1827.New member elected in 1827 or 1828.Jacksonian gain.Successor was seated February 13, 1828.
| nowrap | 

|}

Alabama 

Alabama elected its members August 1–3, 1827, after the term began but before the new Congress convened.

|-
! 
| Gabriel Moore
|  | Jacksonian
| 1821
| Incumbent re-elected.
| nowrap | 

|-
! 
| John McKee
|  | Jacksonian
| 1823
| Incumbent re-elected.
| nowrap | 

|-
! 
| George W. Owen
|  | Jacksonian
| 1823
| Incumbent re-elected.
| nowrap | 

|}

Arkansas Territory 
See Non-voting delegates, below.

Connecticut 

Connecticut elected its members April 12, 1827, after the term began but before the new Congress convened.

|-
! rowspan=6 | 
| Gideon Tomlinson
|  | Anti-Jacksonian
| 1818
|  | Incumbent lost re-election.New member elected.Anti-Jacksonian hold.
| rowspan=6 nowrap | 

|-
| Elisha Phelps
|  | Anti-Jacksonian
| 18181820 1825
| Incumbent re-elected.

|-
| Ralph I. Ingersoll
|  | Anti-Jacksonian
| 1825
| Incumbent re-elected.

|-
| Orange Merwin
|  | Anti-Jacksonian
| 1825
| Incumbent re-elected.

|-
| Noyes Barber
|  | Anti-Jacksonian
| 1821
| Incumbent re-elected.

|-
| John Baldwin
|  | Anti-Jacksonian
| 1825
| Incumbent re-elected.

|}

Delaware 

Delaware elected its member October 3, 1826.

|-
! 
| Louis McLane
|  | Jacksonian
| 1816
| Incumbent re-elected.Incumbent resigned to become U.S. Senator, leading to an October 2, 1827 special election.
| nowrap | 

|}

Florida Territory 
See Non-voting delegates, below.

Georgia 

Georgia elected its members October 2, 1826. Georgia switched to using districts for this election. Two incumbents, James Meriwether and George Cary, did not run for re-election.

|-
! 
| Edward F. Tattnall
|  | Jacksonian
| 1820
| Incumbent re-elected.
| nowrap |  Edward F. Tattnall (Jacksonian) 100%

|-
! rowspan=2 | 
| John Forsyth
|  | Jacksonian
| 1822
| Incumbent re-elected.
| rowspan=2 nowrap |  John Forsyth (Jacksonian) 100%

|-
| George Cary
|  | Jacksonian
| 1822
|  | Incumbent retired.Jacksonian loss.

|-
! 
| Wiley Thompson
|  | Jacksonian
| 1820
| Incumbent re-elected.
| nowrap | 

|-
! 
| James Meriwether
|  | Jacksonian
| 1824
|  | Incumbent retired.New member elected.Jacksonian hold.
| nowrap | 

|-
! 
| Charles E. Haynes
|  | Jacksonian
| 1824
| Incumbent re-elected.
| nowrap | 

|-
! 
| Alfred Cuthbert
|  | Jacksonian
| 1820
|  | Incumbent lost re-election.New member elected.Jacksonian hold.
| nowrap | 

|-
! 
| colspan=3 | None (District created)
|  | New seat.New member elected.Jacksonian gain.
| nowrap | 

|}

Illinois 

Illinois elected its member August 7, 1826.

|-
! 
| Daniel P. Cook
|  | Anti-Jacksonian
| 1819
|  | Incumbent lost re-election.New member elected.Jacksonian gain.
| nowrap | 

|}

Indiana 

Indiana elected its members August 7, 1826.

|-
! 
| Ratliff Boon
|  | Jacksonian
| 1824
|  | Incumbent lost re-election.New member elected.Anti-Jacksonian gain.
| nowrap | 

|-
! 
| Jonathan Jennings
|  | Anti-Jacksonian
| 1822 
| Incumbent re-elected.
| nowrap |  Jonathan Jennings (Anti-Jacksonian) 100%

|-
! 
| John Test
|  | Anti-Jacksonian
| 1822
|  | Incumbent lost re-election.New member elected.Jacksonian gain.
| nowrap | 

|}

Kentucky 

Kentucky elected its members August 6, 1827, after the term began but before the new Congress convened.

|-
! 
| David Trimble
|  | Anti-Jacksonian
| 1816
|  | Incumbent lost re-election.New member elected.Jacksonian gain.
| nowrap | 

|-
! 
| Thomas Metcalfe
|  | Anti-Jacksonian
| 1818
| Incumbent re-elected.
| nowrap | 

|-
! 
| James Clark
|  | Anti-Jacksonian
| 18121816 1825 
| Incumbent re-elected.
| nowrap | 

|-
! 
| Robert P. Letcher
|  | Anti-Jacksonian
| 1822
| Incumbent re-elected.
| nowrap | 

|-
! 
| Robert L. McHatton
|  | Jacksonian
| 1826 
| Incumbent re-elected.
| nowrap | 

|-
! 
| Joseph Lecompte
|  | Jacksonian
| 1824
| Incumbent re-elected.
| nowrap | 

|-
! 
| Thomas P. Moore
|  | Jacksonianian
| 1822
| Incumbent re-elected.
| nowrap | 

|-
! 
| Richard A. Buckner
|  | Anti-Jacksonian
| 1822
| Incumbent re-elected.
| nowrap | 

|-
! 
| Charles A. Wickliffe
|  | Jacksonian
| 1822
| Incumbent re-elected.
| nowrap | 

|-
! 
| Francis Johnson
|  | Anti-Jacksonian
| 1820 
|  | Incumbent lost re-election.New member elected.Jacksonian gain.
| nowrap | 

|-
! 
| William S. Young
|  | Anti-Jacksonian
| 1824
| Incumbent re-elected.
| nowrap | 

|-
! 
| John F. Henry
|  | Anti-Jacksonian
| 1826 
|  | Incumbent lost re-election.New member elected.Jacksonian gain.
| nowrap | 

|}

Louisiana 

Louisiana elected its members July 3–5, 1826.

|-
! 
| Edward Livingston
|  | Jacksonian
| 1822
| Incumbent re-elected.
| nowrap | 

|-
! 
| Henry H. Gurley
|  | Anti-Jacksonian
| 1822
| Incumbent re-elected.
| nowrap | 

|-
! 
| William L. Brent
|  | Anti-Jacksonian
| 1822
| Incumbent re-elected.
| nowrap | 

|}

Maine 

Maine elected its members September 8, 1826. It required a majority for election, which was not met in the 7th district, requiring additional elections December 18, 1826, April 2, and September 27, 1827.

|-
! 
| William Burleigh
|  | Anti-Jacksonian
| 1823
| Incumbent re-elected.Incumbent died July 2, 1827, before the new Congress convened, leading to a special election.
| nowrap | 

|-
! 
| John Anderson
|  | Jacksonian
| 1824
| Incumbent re-elected.
| nowrap | 

|-
! 
| Ebenezer Herrick
|  | Anti-Jacksonian
| 1821
|  | Incumbent retired.New member elected.Anti-Jacksonian hold.
| nowrap | 

|-
! 
| Peleg Sprague
|  | Anti-Jacksonian
| 1825
| Incumbent re-elected.
| nowrap | 

|-
! 
| Enoch Lincoln
|  | Anti-Jacksonian
| 1818 
|  | Incumbent resigned in January 1826.New member elected.Jacksonian gain.Successor later elected to finish the current term.
| nowrap | 

|-
! 
| Jeremiah O'Brien
|  | Anti-Jacksonian
| 1823
| Incumbent re-elected.
| nowrap | 

|-
! 
| David Kidder
|  | Anti-Jacksonian
| 1823
|  | Incumbent retired.New member elected on the fourth ballot.Anti-Jacksonian hold.
| nowrap |     

|}

Maryland 

Maryland elected its members October 2, 1826.

|-
! 
| Clement Dorsey
|  | Anti-Jacksonian
| 1824
| Incumbent re-elected.
| nowrap | 

|-
! 
| John C. Weems
|  | Jacksonian
| 1826 
| Incumbent re-elected.
| nowrap | 

|-
! 
| George Peter
|  | Jacksonian
| 1816 1824
|  | Incumbent lost re-election.New member elected.Anti-Jacksonian gain.
| nowrap | 

|-
! 
| Thomas C. Worthington
|  | Anti-Jacksonian
| 1824
|  | Incumbent retired.New member elected.Jacksonian gain.
| nowrap | 

|-
! rowspan=2 | 
| John Barney
|  | Anti-Jacksonian
| 1824
| Incumbent re-elected.
| rowspan=2 nowrap | 

|-
| Peter Little
|  | Anti-Jacksonian
| 18101812 1816
| Incumbent re-elected.

|-
! 
| George E. Mitchell
|  | Jacksonian
| 1822
|  | Incumbent retired.New member elected.Jacksonian hold.
| nowrap | 

|-
! 
| John Leeds Kerr
|  | Anti-Jacksonian
| 1824
| Incumbent re-elected.
| nowrap | 

|-
! 
| Robert N. Martin
|  | Anti-Jacksonian
| 1824
|  | Incumbent retired.New member elected.Anti-Jacksonian hold.
| nowrap | 

|}

Massachusetts 

Massachusetts elected its members November 6, 1826. It required a majority for election, which was not met on the first vote in 3 districts requiring additional elections held March 5 and May 14, 1827.

District numbers vary between sources.

|-
! 
| Daniel Webster
|  | Anti-Jacksonian
| 18121816 1822
| Incumbent re-elected.Incumbent resigned May 30, 1827, after being elected U.S. Senator, leading to a special election.
| nowrap |  Daniel Webster (Anti-Jacksonian) 100%

|-
! 
| Benjamin W. Crowninshield
|  | Anti-Jacksonian
| 1823
| Incumbent re-elected.
| nowrap | 

|-
! 
| John Varnum
|  | Anti-Jacksonian
| 1825
| Incumbent re-elected.
| nowrap | 

|-
! 
| Edward Everett
|  | Anti-Jacksonian
| 1824
| Incumbent re-elected.
| nowrap |  Edward Everett (Anti-Jacksonian) 100%

|-
! 
| John Davis
|  | Anti-Jacksonian
| 1825
| Incumbent re-elected.
| nowrap | 

|-
! 
| John Locke
|  | Anti-Jacksonian
| 1823
| Incumbent re-elected.
| nowrap | 

|-
! 
| Samuel C. Allen
|  | Anti-Jacksonian
| 1816
| Incumbent re-elected.
| nowrap | 

|-
! 
| Samuel Lathrop
|  | Anti-Jacksonian
| 1819
|  | Incumbent lost re-election.New member elected.Anti-Jacksonian hold.
| nowrap |    

|-
! 
| Henry W. Dwight
|  | Anti-Jacksonian
| 1820
| Incumbent re-elected.
| nowrap |   

|-
! 
| John Bailey
|  | Anti-Jacksonian
| 1823 
| Incumbent re-elected.
| nowrap | 

|-
! 
| Aaron Hobart
|  | Anti-Jacksonian
| 1820
|  | Incumbent retired.New member elected.Anti-Jacksonian hold.
| nowrap | 

|-
! 
| Francis Baylies
|  | Jacksonian
| 1820
|  | Incumbent lost re-election.New member elected.Anti-Jacksonian gain.
| nowrap |    

|-
! 
| John Reed Jr.
|  | Anti-Jacksonian
| 18121816 1820
| Incumbent re-elected.
| nowrap | 

|}

Michigan Territory 
See Non-voting delegates, below.

Mississippi 

Mississippi elected its member August 7, 1826.

|-
! 
| William Haile
|  | Jacksonian
| 1826 
| Incumbent re-elected.
| nowrap | 

|}

Missouri 

Missouri elected its member August 7, 1826.

|-
! 
| John Scott
|  | Anti-Jacksonian
| 1820
|  | Incumbent lost re-election.New member elected.Anti-Jacksonian hold.
| nowrap | 

|}

New Hampshire 

New Hampshire elected its members March 13, 1827, after the term began but before the new Congress convened.

|-
! rowspan=6 | 
| Ichabod Bartlett
|  | Anti-Jacksonian
| 1822
| Incumbent re-elected.
| rowspan=6 nowrap | 

|-
| Jonathan Harvey
|  | Jacksonian
| 1824
| Incumbent re-elected.

|-
| Titus Brown
|  | Anti-Jacksonian
| 1824
| Incumbent re-elected.

|-
| Nehemiah Eastman
|  | Anti-Jacksonian
| 1824
|  | Incumbent lost re-election.New member elected.Anti-Jacksonian hold.

|-
| Thomas Whipple Jr.
|  | Anti-Jacksonian
| 1820
| Incumbent re-elected.

|-
| Joseph Healy
|  | Anti-Jacksonian
| 1824
| Incumbent re-elected.

|}

New Jersey 

New Jersey elected its members October 10, 1826.

|-
! rowspan=6 | 
| Lewis Condict
|  | Anti-Jacksonian
| 1820
| Incumbent re-elected.
| rowspan=6 nowrap | 

|-
| George Holcombe
|  | Jacksonian
| 1820
| Incumbent re-elected.

|-
| George Cassedy
|  | Jacksonian
| 1820
|  | Incumbent lost re-election.New member elected.Anti-Jacksonian gain.

|-
| Daniel Garrison
|  | Jacksonian
| 1822
|  | Incumbent lost re-election.New member elected.Anti-Jacksonian gain.

|-
| Samuel Swan
|  | Anti-Jacksonian
| 1820
| Incumbent re-elected.

|-
| Ebenezer Tucker
|  | Anti-Jacksonian
| 1824
| Incumbent re-elected.

|}

New York 

New York elected its members November 6–8, 1826.

|-
! 
| Silas Wood
|  | Anti-Jacksonian
| 1818
| Incumbent re-elected.
| nowrap | 

|-
! 
| Joshua Sands
|  | Anti-Jacksonian
| 18021804 1824
|  | Incumbent retired.New member elected.Jacksonian gain.
| nowrap | 

|-
! rowspan=3 | 
| Churchill C. Cambreleng
|  | Jacksonian
| 1821
| Incumbent re-elected.
| rowspan=3 nowrap | 

|-
| Gulian Verplanck
|  | Jacksonian
| 1824
| Incumbent re-elected.

|-
| Jeromus Johnson
|  | Jacksonian
| 1824
| Incumbent re-elected.

|-
! 
| Aaron Ward
|  | Anti-Jacksonian
| 1824
| Incumbent re-elected.
| nowrap | 

|-
! 
| Bartow White
|  | Anti-Jacksonian
| 1824
|  | Incumbent retired.New member elected.Jacksonian gain.
| nowrap | 

|-
! 
| John Hallock Jr.
|  | Jacksonian
| 1824
| Incumbent re-elected.
| nowrap | 

|-
! 
| Abraham B. Hasbrouck
|  | Anti-Jacksonian
| 1824
|  | Incumbent retired.New member elected.Jacksonian gain.
| nowrap | 

|-
! 
| James Strong
|  | Anti-Jacksonian
| 18181821 1822
| Incumbent re-elected.
| nowrap | 

|-
! 
| William McManus
|  | Anti-Jacksonian
| 1824
|  | Incumbent retired.New member elected.Anti-Jacksonian hold.
| nowrap | 

|-
! 
| Stephen Van Rensselaer
|  | Anti-Jacksonian
| 1822 (special)
| Incumbent re-elected.
| nowrap |   Stephen Van Rensselaer (Anti-Jacksonian) 100%

|-
! 
| Henry Ashley
|  | Jacksonian
| 1824
|  | Incumbent retired.New member elected.Jacksonian hold.
| nowrap | 

|-
! 
| William Dietz
|  | Jacksonian
| 1824
|  | Incumbent retired.New member elected.Jacksonian hold.
| nowrap |  John I. De Graff (Jacksonian) 100%

|-
! 
| William G. Angel
|  | Anti-Jacksonian
| 1824
|  | Incumbent retired.New member elected.Anti-Jacksonian hold.
| nowrap | 

|-
! 
| Henry R. Storrs
|  | Anti-Jacksonian
| 18161821 1822
| Incumbent re-elected.
| nowrap | 

|-
! 
| Michael Hoffman
|  | Jacksonian
| 1824
| Incumbent re-elected.
| nowrap | 

|-
! 
| Henry Markell
|  | Anti-Jacksonian
| 1824
| Incumbent re-elected.
| nowrap | 

|-
! 
| John W. Taylor
|  | Anti-Jacksonian
| 1812
| Incumbent re-elected.
| nowrap | 

|-
! 
| Henry C. Martindale
|  | Anti-Jacksonian
| 1822
| Incumbent re-elected.
| nowrap | 

|-
! 
| Henry Ross
|  | Anti-Jacksonian
| 1824
|  | Incumbent retired.New member elected.Jacksonian gain.
| nowrap | 

|-
! rowspan=2 | 
| Nicoll Fosdick
|  | Anti-Jacksonian
| 1824
|  | Incumbent lost re-election.New member elected.Jacksonian gain.
| rowspan=2 nowrap | 

|-
| Daniel Hugunin Jr.
|  | Anti-Jacksonian
| 1824
|  | Incumbent retired.New member elected.Jacksonian gain.

|-
! 
| Elias Whitmore
|  | Anti-Jacksonian
| 1824
|  | Incumbent retired.New member elected.Jacksonian gain.
| nowrap | 

|-
! 
| John Miller
|  | Anti-Jacksonian
| 1824
|  | Incumbent lost re-election.New member elected.Jacksonian gain.
| nowrap | 

|-
! 
| Luther Badger
|  | Anti-Jacksonian
| 1824
|  | Incumbent lost re-election.New member elected.Jacksonian gain.
| nowrap | 

|-
! 
| Charles Kellogg
|  | Jacksonian
| 1824
|  | Incumbent retired.New member elected.Jacksonian hold.
| nowrap | 

|-
! 
| Charles Humphrey
|  | Anti-Jacksonian
| 1824
|  | Incumbent lost re-election.New member elected.Anti-Jacksonian hold.
| nowrap | 

|-
! rowspan=2 | 
| Dudley Marvin
|  | Anti-Jacksonian
| 1822
| Incumbent re-elected.
| rowspan=2 nowrap | 

|-
| Robert S. Rose
|  | Anti-Jacksonian
| 1822
|  | Incumbent retired.New member elected.Anti-Jacksonian hold.

|-
! 
| Moses Hayden
|  | Anti-Jacksonian
| 1822
|  | Incumbent retired.New member elected.Anti-Jacksonian hold.
| nowrap | 

|-
! 
| Timothy Porter
|  | Anti-Jacksonian
| 1824
|  | Incumbent lost re-election.New member elected.Jacksonian gain.
| nowrap | 

|-
! 
| Parmenio Adams
|  | Anti-Jacksonian
| 1822
|  | Incumbent retired.New member elected.Jacksonian gain.Successor resigned May 27, 1827, leading to a special election.
| nowrap | 

|-
! 
| Daniel G. Garnsey
|  | Anti-Jacksonian
| 1824
|  | Incumbent re-elected as Jacksonian.Jacksonian gain.
| nowrap | 

|}

North Carolina 

North Carolina elected its members August 9, 1827, after the term began but before the new Congress convened.

|-
! 
| Lemuel Sawyer
|  | Jacksonian
| 18061812 18171823 1825
| Incumbent re-elected.
| nowrap | 

|-
! 
| Willis Alston
|  | Jacksonian
| 17981815 1825
| Incumbent re-elected.
| nowrap |  Willis Alston (Jacksonian) 100%

|-
! 
| Richard Hines
|  | Jacksonian
| 1825
|  | Incumbent lost re-election.New member elected.Jacksonian hold.
| nowrap | 

|-
! 
| John H. Bryan
|  | Anti-Jacksonian
| 1825
| Incumbent re-elected.
| nowrap |  John H. Bryan (Anti-Jacksonian)

|-
! 
| Gabriel Holmes
|  | Jacksonian
| 1825
| Incumbent re-elected.
| nowrap |  Gabriel Holmes (Jacksonian)

|-
! 
| Weldon N. Edwards
|  | Jacksonian
| 1816 
|  | Incumbent retired.New member elected.Jacksonian hold.
| nowrap | 

|-
! 
| Archibald McNeill
|  | Jacksonian
| 18211823 (Retired?)1825
|  | Incumbent retired.New member elected.Anti-Jacksonian gain.
| nowrap | 

|-
! 
| Daniel L. Barringer
|  | Jacksonian
| 1826 
| Incumbent re-elected.
| nowrap | 

|-
! 
| Romulus M. Saunders
|  | Jacksonian
| 1821
|  | Incumbent retired.New member elected.Jacksonian hold.
| nowrap | 

|-
! 
| John Long
|  | Anti-Jacksonian
| 1821
| Incumbent re-elected.
| nowrap | 

|-
! 
| Henry W. Connor
|  | Jacksonian
| 1821
| Incumbent re-elected.
| nowrap | 

|-
! 
| Samuel P. Carson
|  | Jacksonian
| 1825
| Incumbent re-elected.
| nowrap | 

|-
! 
| Lewis Williams
|  | Anti-Jacksonian
| 1815
| Incumbent re-elected.
| nowrap | 

|}

Vance was mortally wounded in the duel. Carson left immediately afterwards to go to Washington.

Ohio 

Ohio elected its members October 10, 1826.

|-
! 
| James Findlay
|  | Jacksonian
| 1824
| Incumbent re-elected.
| nowrap | 

|-
! 
| John Woods
|  | Anti-Jacksonian
| 1824
| Incumbent re-elected.
| nowrap | 

|-
! 
| William McLean
|  | Anti-Jacksonian
| 1822
| Incumbent re-elected.
| nowrap | 

|-
! 
| Joseph Vance
|  | Anti-Jacksonian
| 1820
| Incumbent re-elected.
| nowrap | 

|-
! 
| John W. Campbell
|  | Anti-Jacksonian
| 1816
|  | Incumbent retired.New member elected.Jacksonian gain.
| nowrap | 

|-
! 
| John Thomson
|  | Jacksonian
| 1824
|  | Incumbent lost re-election.New member elected.Anti-Jacksonian gain.
| nowrap | 

|-
! 
| Samuel F. Vinton
|  | Anti-Jacksonian
| 1822
| Incumbent re-elected.
| nowrap | 

|-
! 
| William Wilson
|  | Anti-Jacksonian
| 1822
| Incumbent re-elected.
| nowrap | 

|-
! 
| Philemon Beecher
|  | Anti-Jacksonian
| 18161820 1822
| Incumbent re-elected.
| nowrap | 

|-
! 
| David Jennings
|  | Anti-Jacksonian
| 1824
|  | Incumbent resigned May 25, 1826.New member elected.Anti-Jacksonian hold.Successor lost the election on the same day to finish the term.
| nowrap | 

|-
! 
| John C. Wright
|  | Anti-Jacksonian
| 1822
| Incumbent re-elected.
| nowrap | 

|-
! 
| John Sloane
|  | Anti-Jacksonian
| 1818
| Incumbent re-elected.
| nowrap | 

|-
! 
| Elisha Whittlesey
|  | Anti-Jacksonian
| 1822
| Incumbent re-elected.
| nowrap |  Elisha Whittlesey (Anti-Jacksonian) 100%

|-
! 
| Mordecai Bartley
|  | Anti-Jacksonian
| 1822
| Incumbent re-elected.
| nowrap | 

|}

Pennsylvania 

Pennsylvania elected its members October 10, 1826.

|-
! 
| John Wurts
|  | Jacksonian
| 1824
|  | Incumbent retired.New member elected.Jacksonian hold.
| nowrap | 

|-
! 
| Joseph Hemphill
|  | Jacksonian
| 18001802 1818
|  | Incumbent resigned before October 10, 1826.New member not elected due to tie vote between the top two candidates, leading to an October 9, 1827 special election.Jacksonian loss.
| nowrap | 

|-
! 
| Daniel H. Miller
|  | Jacksonian
| 1822
| Incumbent re-elected.
| nowrap | 

|-
! rowspan=3 | 
| James Buchanan
|  | Jacksonian
| 1820
| Incumbent re-elected.
| rowspan=3 nowrap | 

|-
| Samuel Edwards
|  | Jacksonian
| 1818
|  | Incumbent retired.New member elected.Anti-Jacksonian gain.

|-
| Charles Miner
|  | Anti-Jacksonian
| 1824
| Incumbent re-elected.

|-
! 
| Philip S. Markley
|  | Anti-Jacksonian
| 1822
|  | Incumbent lost re-election.New member elected.Jacksonian gain.
| nowrap | 

|-
! 
| Robert Harris
|  | Jacksonian
| 1822
|  | Incumbent retired.New member elected.Jacksonian hold.
| nowrap | 

|-
! rowspan=2 | 
| William Addams
|  | Jacksonian
| 1824
| Incumbent re-elected.
| rowspan=2 nowrap | 

|-
| Henry Wilson
|  | Jacksonian
| 1822
|  | Incumbent died August 14, 1826.New member elected.Jacksonian hold.Successor not elected the same day to finish the current term.

|-
! rowspan=2 | 
| George Wolf
|  | Jacksonian
| 1824
| Incumbent re-elected.
| rowspan=2 nowrap | 

|-
| Samuel D. Ingham
|  | Jacksonian
| 18121818 1822 
| Incumbent re-elected.

|-
! rowspan=3 | 
| George Kremer
|  | Jacksonian
| 1822
| Incumbent re-elected.
| rowspan=2 nowrap | 

|-
| Espy Van Horne
|  | Jacksonian
| 1824
| Incumbent re-elected.

|-
| Samuel McKean
|  | Jacksonian
| 1822
| Incumbent re-elected.

|-
! 
| James S. Mitchell
|  | Jacksonian
| 1820
|  | Incumbent retired.New member elected.Jacksonian hold.
| nowrap | 

|-
! rowspan=2 | 
| James Wilson
|  | Anti-Jacksonian
| 1822
| Incumbent re-elected.
| rowspan=2 nowrap | 

|-
| John Findlay
|  | Jacksonian
| 1821 
|  | Incumbent retired.New member elected.Jacksonian hold.

|-
! 
| John Mitchell
|  | Jacksonian
| 1824
| Incumbent re-elected.
| nowrap | 

|-
! 
| Alexander Thomson
|  | Jacksonian
| 1824
|  | Incumbent resigned May 1, 1826.New member elected.Jacksonian hold.Successor was also elected the same day to finish the current term.
| nowrap | 

|-
! 
| Andrew Stewart
|  | Jacksonian
| 1820
|  | Incumbent re-elected to a different party.Anti-Jacksonian gain.
| nowrap | 

|-
! 
| Joseph Lawrence
|  | Anti-Jacksonian
| 1824
| Incumbent re-elected.
| nowrap |  Joseph Lawrence (Anti-Jacksonian) 100%

|-
! rowspan=2 | 
| Robert Orr Jr.
|  | Jacksonian
| 1825 
| Incumbent re-elected.
| rowspan=2 nowrap | 

|-
| James S. Stevenson
|  | Jacksonian
| 1824
| Incumbent re-elected.

|-
! 
| George Plumer
|  | Jacksonian
| 1820
|  | Incumbent retired.New member elected.Jacksonian hold.
| nowrap | 

|-
! 
| Thomas H. Sill
|  | Anti-Jacksonian
| 1826 
|  | Incumbent lost re-election.New member elected.Jacksonian gain.
| nowrap | 

|}

Rhode Island 

Rhode Island elected its members August 30, 1827, after the term began but before the new Congress convened.

|-
! rowspan=2 | 
| Tristam Burges
|  | Anti-Jacksonian
| 1825
| Incumbent re-elected.
| rowspan=2 nowrap | 

|-
| Dutee J. Pearce
|  | Anti-Jacksonian
| 1825
| Incumbent re-elected.

|}

South Carolina 

South Carolina elected its members October 9–10, 1826.

|-
! 
| William Drayton
|  | Jacksonian
| 1825 
| Incumbent re-elected.
| nowrap |  William Drayton (Jacksonian)

|-
! 
| James Hamilton Jr.
|  | Jacksonian
| 1822 
| Incumbent re-elected.
| nowrap |  James Hamilton Jr. (Jacksonian) 100%

|-
! 
| Thomas R. Mitchell
|  | Jacksonian
| 18201823 1824
| Incumbent re-elected.
| nowrap | 

|-
! 
| Andrew R. Govan
|  | Jacksonian
| 1822 
|  | Incumbent lost re-election.New member elected.Jacksonian hold.
| nowrap | 

|-
! 
| George McDuffie
|  | Jacksonian
| 1820
| Incumbent re-elected.
| nowrap |  George McDuffie (Jacksonian)

|-
! 
| John Wilson
|  | Jacksonian
| 1820
|  | Incumbent lost re-election.New member elected.Jacksonian hold.
| nowrap | 

|-
! 
| Joseph Gist
|  | Jacksonian
| 1820
|  | Incumbent retired.New member elected.Jacksonian hold.
| nowrap | 

|-
! 
| John Carter
|  | Jacksonian
| 1822 
| Incumbent re-elected.
| nowrap |  John Carter (Jacksonian) 100%

|-
! 
| Starling Tucker
|  | Jacksonian
| 1816
| Incumbent re-elected.
| nowrap |  Starling Tucker (Jacksonian)

|}

Tennessee 

Tennessee elected its members August 2–3, 1827, after the term began but before the new Congress convened.

|-
! 
| John Blair
|  | Jacksonian
| 1823
| Incumbent re-elected.
| nowrap | 

|-
! 
| John Cocke
|  | Jacksonian
| 1819
|  | Incumbent retired.New member elected.Jacksonian hold.
| nowrap | 

|-
! 
| James C. Mitchell
|  | Jacksonian
| 1825
| Incumbent re-elected.
| nowrap | 

|-
! 
| Jacob C. Isacks
|  | Jacksonian
| 1823
| Incumbent re-elected.
| nowrap |  Jacob C. Isacks (Jacksonian) 100%

|-
! 
| Robert Allen
|  | Jacksonian
| 1819
|  | Incumbent retired.New member elected.Jacksonian hold.
| nowrap | 

|-
! 
| James K. Polk
|  | Jacksonian
| 1825
| Incumbent re-elected.
| nowrap | 

|-
! 
| Sam Houston
|  | Jacksonian
| 1823
|  | Incumbent retired.New member elected.Jacksonian hold.
| nowrap | 

|-
! 
| John H. Marable
|  | Jacksonian
| 1825
| Incumbent re-elected.
| nowrap | 

|-
! 
| Adam R. Alexander
|  | Jacksonian
| 1823
|  | Incumbent lost re-election.New member elected.Jacksonian hold.
| nowrap | 

|}

Vermont 

Vermont elected its members September 5, 1826. It required a majority for election, which was not met on the first vote in two districts, requiring additional elections held December 4, 1826 and February 5, 1827.

|-
! 
| William C. Bradley
|  | Anti-Jacksonian
| 18121814 1822
|  | Incumbent retired.New member elected.Anti-Jacksonian hold.
| nowrap |    

|-
! 
| Rollin C. Mallary
|  | Anti-Jacksonian
| 1818
| Incumbent re-elected.
| nowrap |  Rollin C. Mallary (Anti-Jacksonian) 100%

|-
! 
| George E. Wales
|  | Anti-Jacksonian
| 1824
| Incumbent re-elected.
| nowrap |  George E. Wales (Anti-Jacksonian) 100%

|-
! 
| Ezra Meech
|  | Jacksonian
| 18181820 1824
|  | Incumbent retired.New member elected.Anti-Jacksonian gain.
| nowrap |    

|-
! 
| John Mattocks
|  | Anti-Jacksonian
| 18201822 1824
|  | Incumbent retired.New member elected.Anti-Jacksonian hold.
| nowrap | 

|}

Virginia 

Virginia elected its members April 30, 1827, after the term began but before the new Congress convened.

|-
! 
| Thomas Newton Jr.
|  | Anti-Jacksonian
| 1801
| Incumbent re-elected.
| nowrap | 

|-
! 
| James Trezvant
|  | Jacksonian
| 1825
| Incumbent re-elected.
| nowrap |  James Trezvant (Jacksonian) 100%

|-
! 
| William S. Archer
|  | Jacksonian
| 1820 
| Incumbent re-elected.
| nowrap |  William S. Archer (Jacksonian) 100%

|-
! 
| Mark Alexander
|  | Jacksonian
| 1819
| Incumbent re-elected.
| nowrap |  Mark Alexander (Jacksonian) 100%

|-
! 
| George W. Crump
|  | Jacksonian
| 1826 
|  | Incumbent retired.New member elected.Jacksonian hold.
| nowrap |  John Randolph (Jacksonian) 100%

|-
! 
| Thomas Davenport
|  | Jacksonian
| 1825
| Incumbent re-elected.
| nowrap |  Thomas Davenport (Jacksonian) 100%

|-
! 
| Nathaniel H. Claiborne
|  | Jacksonian
| 1825
| Incumbent re-elected.
| nowrap | 

|-
! 
| Burwell Bassett
|  | Jacksonian
| 18051812 18151819 1821
| Incumbent re-elected.
| nowrap |  Burwell Bassett (Jacksonian) 100%

|-
! 
| Andrew Stevenson
|  | Jacksonian
| 1821
| Incumbent re-elected.
| nowrap |  Andrew Stevenson (Jacksonian) 100%

|-
! 
| William C. Rives
|  | Jacksonian
| 1823
| Incumbent re-elected.
| nowrap |  William C. Rives (Jacksonian) 100%

|-
! 
| Robert Taylor
|  | Anti-Jacksonian
| 1825
|  | Incumbent retired.New member elected.Jacksonian gain.
| nowrap |  Philip P. Barbour (Jacksonian) 100%

|-
! 
| Robert S. Garnett
|  | Jacksonian
| 1817
|  | Incumbent retired.New member elected.Jacksonian hold.
| nowrap |  John Roane (Jacksonian) 100%

|-
! 
| John Taliaferro
|  | Anti-Jacksonian
| 18011803 1811 (Challenge)1813 1824 
| Incumbent re-elected.
| nowrap | 

|-
! 
| Charles F. Mercer
|  | Anti-Jacksonian
| 1817
| Incumbent re-elected.
| nowrap | 

|-
! 
| John S. Barbour
|  | Jacksonian
| 1823
| Incumbent re-elected.
| nowrap | 

|-
! 
| William Armstrong
|  | Anti-Jacksonian
| 1825
| Incumbent re-elected.
| nowrap | 

|-
! 
| Alfred H. Powell
|  | Anti-Jacksonian
| 1825
|  | Incumbent lost re-election.New member elected.Jacksonian gain.
| nowrap | 

|-
! 
| Joseph Johnson
|  | Jacksonian
| 1823
|  | Incumbent lost re-election.New member elected.Anti-Jacksonian gain.
| nowrap | 

|-
! 
| William McCoy
|  | Jacksonian
| 1811
| Incumbent re-elected.
| nowrap |  William McCoy (Jacksonian)

|-
! 
| John Floyd
|  | Jacksonian
| 1817
| Incumbent re-elected.
| nowrap | 

|-
! 
| William Smith
|  | Jacksonian
| 1821
|  | Incumbent retired.New member elected.Anti-Jacksonian gain.
| nowrap | 

|-
! 
| Benjamin Estil
|  | Anti-Jacksonian
| 1825
|  | Incumbent retired.New member elected.Jacksonian gain.
| nowrap | 

|}

Non-voting delegates 

|-
! 
| Henry Conway
| Unknown
| 1822
| Incumbent re-elected.Incumbent then died November 9, 1827, leading to a special election.
| nowrap |  Henry Conway

|-
! 
| Joseph M. White
|  | Jacksonian
| 1824
| Incumbent re-elected.
| nowrap |  Joseph M. White (Jacksonian)

|-
! 
| Austin E. Wing
|  | Anti-Jacksonian
| 1824
| Incumbent re-elected.
| nowrap |  Austin E. Wing (Anti-Jacksonian)

|}

See also
 1826 United States elections
 List of United States House of Representatives elections (1824–1854)
 1826–27 United States Senate elections
 19th United States Congress
 20th United States Congress

Notes

References

Bibliography

External links
 Office of the Historian (Office of Art & Archives, Office of the Clerk, U.S. House of Representatives)